Ivan Leonidovich Maximov (born 19 November 1958) is a Russian artist, animator and film director.

Biography
Ivan Maximov was born on 19 November 1958 in Moscow. He studied photography at the Biophysical Institute in Moscow till 1976. From 1976 - 1982 Maximov studied at the Moscow Institute of Physics and Technology in Moscow. He worked as an illustrator for various magazines and from 1982 to 1986 he was an engineer at the Russian Space Research Institute. Between 1986 and 1989 Maximov took advanced studies in Film Directing and Script writing.

In the early 1990s, Maximov became involved with Russia's first gaming magazine, Video-Ace Dendy, and the television series, Dendy: The New Reality. Here he was in charge of designing Dendy the Elephant, Dendy's trademark mascot.

Starting in 1995 Maximov worked as "virtual studio IVAN MAXIMOV" where he set up his studio at home to work on film, video and computer animation. He worked as a caricaturist for VREMYA mn and in 2000 and 2001 he worked as a caricaturist for VREMYA NOVOSTEY.

In 2003, Maximov created the computer game Full Pipe at PIPE-STUDIO. The same year, he also began teaching film directing and script writing at school-studio SHAR and VGIK.

From 2002 - teacher of film directing in school-studio "SHAR"

From 2011 - teacher of animation filmdirecting in " PiterMultArt " in Saint-Petersburg

From 2011 to 2019 - artistic supervisor of animated series "Lucky!"

From 2019 - teacher of film directing in the Modern Art Institute

Animated films
Most of these films can be viewed in their entirety on his official website.
 Sleva Napravo (1989)
 5/4 (1990)
 Provintsialnaya Shkola (1992)
 Bolero (1992)
 N + 2 (1993)
 Libido Bendzhamina (1994)
 Niti (1996)
 Dva tramvaya (1997)
 Eta Meloch Zashchitit Oboikh (2000)
 Sotvoreniye Mira za 24 Sekundy (2000)
 Luba (2001)
 Medlennoye Bistro (2003)
 Veter Vdol Berega (2003)
 Potop (2004)
 Tunnelirovaniye (2005)
 Dozhd Sverkhu Vniz (2007)
 Dopolnitelnyye Vozmozhnosti Pyatachka (2008)
 Prilivy Tuda-Syuda (2010)
 Vne Igry (2012)
 Dlinnyy Most v Nuzhnuyu Storonu (2012)
 Doch Rybaka (2013)
 Skameyki (2015)
 Khudozhnik i Khuligany (2016)
 Alternativnaya Progulka (2016)
 Divergentia D (2017)
 Lonely monster goes out (2019)
 O, neet! (2021)

Animated computer games
 Full Pipe (PC, 2003)

Awards

State and departmental awards
2012 (January 16) - Medal of the Order "For Merit to the Fatherland"
2013 (April 22) - Medal of the Order "For Merit to the Fatherland"

Prizes
1991 - Nika Award nominee for 5/4
1993 - Nika Award for Best Film for Bolero
2003 - Nika Award nominee for Slow Bistro
2007 - Golden Eagle nominee for Dozhd Sverkhu Vniz
2008 - Nika Award nominee for Dozhd Sverkhu Vniz
2012 - Golden Eagle nominee for Vne Igry
2013 - Nika Award nominee for Dlinnyy Most v Nuzhnuyu Storonu
2014 - Golden Eagle nominee for Dlinnyy Most v Nuzhnuyu Storonu

Prizes at film festivals

1989 - "From Left To Right" [4 minutes] (part 2 of "FRU-89") student work. Awards - special prize at national festival of non-commercial films "Vita Longa" Moscow-1991
1990 - "5/4", diploma-film [7 minutes], Awards - Prize for the best animation film at DEBUT-festival. Moscow - 1991 Prize "KROKPRESCI" at festival "KROK" - 91 Prize "INFINITY OF COMPREHENDING OF LUMIERS" at Hanzhonkov festival of filmminiatures. Moscow - 1993 Prize FIPRESCI in Oberhausen-91, prize for best cartoons in GYOR-94, III prize of "JAZZ IMAGE" in ROMA-96.
1992 - "BOLERO" [5 minutes], Prize "Gold Bear" in Berlin-93. Professional prize "NIKA" (Moscow-1993)for the best animation film made in 1992 Cup of Montecatini Terme 1994
1994 - "LIBIDO OF BENJAMINO" [7 minutes], prize of HUMOR-Academy "GOLD OSTAP" (Snt Piterburg-1994)
2001 - "Luba" [4 minutes] prize for best commercial animation in KROK-2001,
2004 - "WIND ALONG THE COAST" [7 minutes], prize in CINANIMA (Espinho, Portugal) prize in CHANGZHOU (China) prize in Evora (Portugal) prize in Corto Imola (Italy) prize in Gold Fish (Moscow) Audience prize in Fantoche (Baden, Switzerland) prize in KROK (Ukraina) prize in Zagreb (Croatia)
2005 - "Tonnellage" [5 minutes] prize of AniBOOM Online Animation Competition
2007 - "Rain down from above" [8 minutes] prize in KROK (Ukraina) the ESPECIAL AWARD CAMPUS AQUAE of Animacam.tv
2010 - "Tides to and fro" [10 minutes] prize in KROK (Ukraina)
2011 - "Out of play" [6 minutes] prize in Varna (Bulgaria)
2012 - "Long bridge of desired direction" [9 minutes] prize in Varna prize in Blackrock (Irland) prize in Banja Luka (Bosnia and Herzegovina)
2013 - "Bum-Bum, the baby of the fisher" [8 minutes] Grand Prix at the 44th annual Tampere Film Festival
2014 - "Benches №0458" [7 minutes] winner in the category - short films from 1 to 10 min. IAFF Golden kuker - Sofia 2016 2nd Audience Prize in Wiesbaden - the section "Best of International Animation 2015/2016", Internationales Trickfilm-Wochenende, International Weekend of Animation.
2016 - "Artist and hooligans" [12 minutes] (by Ivan Maximov & Anna Romanova) Special Mention from Koji Yamamura "For the joy of freedom in play and unexpected events in free structure by the child's point of view".
2016 - "ALTERNATIVE WALK" has been awarded a SPECIAL MENTION IN THE CATEGORY SHORT FILM UP TO 5 MINUTES at the 41st edition of CINANIMA - International Animated Film Festival of Espinho, Portugal.
2019 - "Lonely monster goes out" [7 minutes] prize on 8th Athens International Digital Film Festival, prize for The BEST ADULT Film on TOFUZI 11th International Animated Film Festival (Batumi).

See also
History of Russian animation
Melbourne International Animation Festival

References

External links

Ivan Maximov's site
Full filmography at animator.ru

Ivan Maximov's Kroogi account 
Ivan Maximov's LiveJournal 

1958 births
People's Artists of Russia
Russian animators
Russian animated film directors
Russian film directors
Russian artists
Moscow Institute of Physics and Technology alumni
Living people